Gabriel Gonzalez Pereyra (1789-1868), Dominican priest, Bajacalifornio guerrilla in Mexican–American War.

References

External links
  photo of Gabriel Gonzalez Pereyra from aviada.blogspot.com accessed August 30, 2013

Mexican military personnel of the Mexican–American War
1789 births
1868 deaths
People of Mexican California
People from Baja California